is a Japanese anime series, that retells the events from the Super Robot Taisen: Original Generation game, a game featuring only original characters and mechs created by Banpresto for the Super Robot Wars franchise. A sequel titled  began airing on the October 1, 2010.

Summary
The anime is not a direct adaptation of the original video game, it includes several changes to the plot. While the original game allows the player to decide which of the two protagonists' stories they will follow, the animated series focuses on Ryusei Date's side of the story, with all the other characters already introduced.

Plot
It is two hundred years after the beginning of the Space Era, when human civilization on Earth began expanding into space. However, by the start of the 21st century, two meteors struck the planet, sending humanity into chaos. By the year 179 of the Space Era, secret technology, dubbed Extra-Over Technology, or EOT, was discovered by the Earth Federal Government within a third meteor that hit Earth in the Marquesas Islands of the South Pacific. Dr. Bian Zoldark, head of the EOTI Institute (Extra-Over Technological Investigative Institute), had evidence the creators of the EOT were heading to Earth, in order to reclaim it...or worse, invade the planet. In order to defend humanity from extraterrestrial threats, the government begins to research and develop humanoid mecha called Personal Troopers.

The alien race that created the EOT, the Aerogaters, attacked an Earth ship sent out to investigate their presence in the far reaches of the Solar System. This skirmish ends in a defeat for the Aerogaters, prompting the Earth government to negotiate with them. Talks are arranged to take place at a secret facility in Antarctica, but the event is targeted by a rogue faction called the Divine Crusaders. The Divine Crusaders destroy the Aerogater delegation, then turn on the Earth forces. Bian Zoldark, the faction's leader, uses this opportunity to rebel against the Earth government, in hopes of establishing a viable defense for Earth from the Aerogaters and future invaders.

Characters

Main characters

 
 A mecha otaku and finalist for the Burning PT Tournament, he is the protagonist of Divine Wars, drafted by the Earth Federation Army for their secret SRX Development Project.

 
 A stalwart test pilot for the Earth Federation Army, he is the next person to be part of the SRX Development Project.

 
 A relatively new and inexperienced member of the military, she is the third person to be part of the SRX Development Project.

 
 A mysterious, yet influential military instructor, currently in charge of the SRX Development Project.

Supporting Characters

 
 A quiet young girl who was the part of an experimental project to create Personal Trooper pilots. She begins to open up more after befriending Ryusei and develops a crush on him.

 
 A serious, stoic test pilot of the ATX Team, who has a habit with gambling.

 
 A fun-loving, somewhat ditzy pilot of the ATX Team and Kyosuke's girlfriend, she makes men uncomfortable with her flirting and jokes.

 
 A rookie pilot from the ATX Team, with extensive training and abilities, he insists that others address him as Bullet.

 
 The leader of the ATX Team, he fights with the skills and demeanor of an ancient Samurai.

 
 A kind-hearted childhood friend of Ryusei, she enlists into the Earth Federation Army as a nurse.

 
 A rash, young pilot of the mysterious Cybuster, he pursues his nemesis, Shu Shirakawa, with the help of his familiar cats, Kuro and Shiro, in order to settle old scores.

 
 A brilliant scientist, who is familiar with Masaki Andoh, he helps Bian Zoldark establish the Divine Crusaders and revolt against the Earth government.

 
 The older brother of Raidiese, he and his father, Maier V. Branstein, forge an alliance with Bian Zoldark's Divine Crusaders.

 
 The founder of the EOTI Institute and leader of the Divine Crusaders, he wages war against the Earth government, in order to make humanity realize the incoming threat of alien invasions.

 
 Daughter of Bian Zoldark, founder of the Divine Crusaders. Lune's an outspoken tomboy with torn jeans and a high aptitude for mecha piloting. She was a member of the DC, but spent most of the time physically training in Jupiter. About her mecha, she was supposedly given a customized Valsion, but she didn't like how it looked... so Bian modified its look to resemble a giant, walking robot version of herself, the Valsione, complete with hair and an emotion copy system (its face changes according to Lune's current expression).

 
 Is a calm, loyal, clear-headed man with a pleasant attitude, akin to that of a gentleman.
 He has a strong sense of justice, often disliking to see the weak being bullied or hurt by those with power.

 
 A passionate, 18-year-old girl, Ricarla "Carla" Borgnine is extremely nice and caring to her companions and comrades, usually helping them with their problems, regardless of how minuscule they may be. Carla looks optimistically to the future, though her past is what troubles her the most.

Divine Crusaders

United Colony Corps

Aerogators

Principality of Ricsent

Earth Federal Government

Earth Federation Army

Mao Industry

Other characters

 

 

 

 /

Media

Anime
The anime was produced by Oriental Light and Magic with Hiroyuki Kakudō as director and Super Robot Wars series producer, Takanobu Terada acting in the role of Series Composition. The show first aired on October 4, 2006 on TV Tokyo with the 25th episode being aired on 29 March 2007. The anime aired for a total of 25 episodes, but the 26th episode was released on DVD only. The show featured the use of 3DCG to animate the mecha within the show.

Four pieces of theme music are used within the show, two opening songs and two ending songs. The first opening theme is Break Out by JAM Project while the first ending song is Yell!! by Minami Kuribayashi.

Bandai Visual USA had licensed the show in North America. The show was released across 9 different volumes. It was re-licensed by Media Blasters, which was released on May 17, 2014. The series premiered on Toku in the United States on December 31, 2015.

Manga
The anime has two manga adaptations,  by Akihiro Kimura tells the story of the anime over 6 volumes published from 2006 to 2009. Meanwhile,  is manga series by Tatsunosuke Yatsufusa, published from 2007 to 2009, that tells a similar story but from the ATX Team's perspective, complete in 5 volumes.

Net Radio
With the launch of the anime,  began to air online. The show has been airing since January 2007 with four regular hosts, Tomokazu Sugita, Masaaki Endoh, Mai Aizawa and Rie Saitou. The show often features series' producer Takanobu Terada as a special guest. After Divine Wars ended, the show carried on and is often used to regularly feature and promote up and coming video game titles.

Production

 Director: Hiroyuki Kakudō
 Series Composition: Takanobu Terada
 Mechanical Design: Hajime Katoki, Kunio Okawara, Kazutaka Miyatake, Seiji Ono, Junichi Moriya, Hitoshi Kamemaru, Toshiaki Sugiura, Kazue Saito
 Music: Takuya Hanaoka, Yoshihisa Hirano, Naofumi Tsuruyama
 CG Supervisor: Ichiro Itano
 Character Design: Yuji Ikeda
 Animation Production: OLM, Inc.
 Production: SRWOG PROJECT, Genco

References

External links
 

2007 anime OVAs
Anime Works
Bandai Visual
Mecha anime and manga
OLM, Inc.
Super Robot Wars
Terrorism in fiction